Rulevoy is a rural locality (a settlement) in Stepnovskoye Rural Settlement, Nikolayevsky District, Volgograd Oblast, Russia. The population was 334 as of 2010. There are 5 streets.

Geography 
Rulevoy is located in steppe on the left bank of the Volgograd Reservoir, 36 km east of Nikolayevsk (the district's administrative centre) by road. Stepnovsky is the nearest rural locality.

References 

Rural localities in Nikolayevsky District, Volgograd Oblast